Cooper MacNeil (born September 7, 1992 in Hinsdale, Illinois) is a retired professional American racecar driver. He most recently competed in the WeatherTech SportsCar Championship driving the No. 79 WeatherTech Racing Mercedes-Benz AMG GT3 with co-drivers Dani Juncadella, Maro Engel, and Jules Gounon. He is son of WeatherTech owner and car collector David MacNeil. Cooper has won the 24 Hours of Daytona, Petit Le Mans three times, 12 hours of Sebring twice, and has been on the podium at the 24 Hours of Le Mans three times (2x third place, 1x second place). He has also won the SCCA Runoffs and is a 4 time Ferrari Challenge Champion.

2010
Cooper won the National SCCA Touring 2 Points Championship and finished 2nd Place in the SCCA Runoffs at Road America.

2011
Cooper competed in his first 24 Hours of Daytona. He captured his first win in Ferrari Challenge at Mazda Raceway Laguna Seca as well as his first win in IMSA GT3 Cup Challenge at Montreal.

2012
Alex Job Racing racing with a full ride with teammate Leh Keen. During the 12 Hours of Sebring Leh and his teammates led a strong battle throughout the race. Encountered minor hiccups and climbed one spot to a second-place finish. At Long Beach consistent podium battle. Lost lead half way through on pit stop and never regained the top position. Leh won pole at Lime Rock Park. Cooper started the Porsche and keeps team in top three before handing car to Leh who, despite several on-track run ins, brings the car home in first place under caution. Leh qualified car in third at Canadian Tire Motorsport Park. Cooper MacNeil starts car and has excellent run, handing car over to Cooper in the GTC lead. Leh dices with #66 Porsche and #11 Porsche before finishing second. Leh and Cooper struggle with brake issues early at Mid-Ohio Sports Car Course and finishing fourth. Cooper started car in second at Baltimore and hands off to Leh still running second. Leh lead briefly, but finished second. Cooper and Leh ran in top three for duration of VIR race, leading multiple times. Leh took the lead on final lap when #11 JDX car must pit for fuel. The win seals GTC driver championship for Cooper and team championship for Alex Job Racing. As for in the Rolex Sports Car Series Leh and Andrew finished eighth in GT points. Four third-place finishes, including Rolex 24 At Daytona and Indianapolis Motor Speedway.

Retirement
MacNeil retired from racing after the 2023 24 Hours of Daytona to focus on running WeatherTech.

SCCA National Championship Runoffs

24 Hours of Le Mans results

Complete WeatherTech SportsCar Championship results
(key) (Races in bold indicate pole position; results in italics indicate fastest lap)

References

 
 

1992 births
Living people
24 Hours of Le Mans drivers
People from Hinsdale, Illinois
Racing drivers from Illinois
Rolex Sports Car Series drivers
American Le Mans Series drivers
FIA World Endurance Championship drivers
WeatherTech SportsCar Championship drivers
24 Hours of Daytona drivers
24H Series drivers
Larbre Compétition drivers
Ferrari Challenge drivers